Brisbane Street is a street in Hobart, Tasmania. The street was named for Sir Thomas Makdougall Brisbane, the sixth Governor of New South Wales.

Route description
The street commences at an intersection with the Brooker Highway in Hobart. It runs in a south-westerly direction, first crossing Campbell Street. A former convict penitentiary and chapel, now known as the Campbell Street Gaol, is on the south-west corner of this intersection. Now open to the public, its official address is 6 Brisbane Street.

It next crosses Argyle Street and then Elizabeth Street. Between these two streets, on the northern side, are two nineteenth century former Congregational churches. The next major cross streets are Murray Street and Harrington Street. St Mary's Cathedral precinct is on the north-west corner of the Harrington Street intersection.

The street next crosses Barrack Street and ends at Hill Street. This section was the last developed due to its hilly nature. The southern side of this section is part of a heritage precinct featuring typical forms of early housing.

St Mary's Cathedral precinct
St Mary's Cathedral precinct is located at the corner of Brisbane and Harrington Streets.  It includes St Peter's Hall.

Congregational church buildings
As an early named street in Hobart, it was the location of a number of significant activities and buildings in the colonial era. The Brisbane Street Chapel, the Brisbane Street  Congregational Hall,  The Memorial Hall was regularly used for a range of activities
An older structure of the Congregational church was demolished in 1889 to make way for a newer building.

In 2018, a book of the churches in colonial Hobart identified the congregational buildings as surviving through to contemporary times.
 Independent Congregational Chapel, 71 Brisbane Street 
 Memorial Congregational Church, 73 Brisbane Street

The Hobart Women's Christian Temperance Union was located in the 1930s at 112 Brisbane Street.  It also utilised adjacent facilities.

Reverend Frederick Miller memorial
A memorial plaque, commemorating Reverend Frederick Miller, the first independent minister in the Australian colonies, and the founder of the Congregational church in Hobart, is located at 73 Brisbane Street.

Hotel and accommodation
The former Ye Old Commodore hotel established in the 1800s, later known as the Brisbane Hotel changed hands in the 1920s.

The Sydney Lodge Guest House operated in the 1930s.
Other businesses on the street in the 1920's and 1930's included Absalom's Motor Garage, and Tasmanian Corrugated Paper.

Land Commissioners report
When the Land Commissioners reported to Lieutenant-Governor Arthur on the use of land in the colony of Van Diemens Land in 1826 they included a map which showed that Brisbane Street had been surveyed only as far west as Barrack Street. They assumed this was because colonists were reluctant to build on the hilly ground further west. With some foresight they predicted a future demand for this land and set a higher valuation for it.

See also

References

Streets in Hobart